Sweet potato mild mottle virus (SPMMV) is a plant pathogenic virus of the family Potyviridae.

Host and symptoms
Sweet Potato Mild Mottle Virus (or SPMMV) has a large host range. This is uncommon for potyviruses, making SPMMV a divergent species of potyviruses. SPMMV hosts include 45 different species in 14 different plant families. The naturally occurring host, and namesake for the virus is Ipomoea batatas (sweet potato). Even though SPMMV is found naturally in sweet potato, scientists have been able to experimentally transmit the virus to different species including beets, sowbane, devil’s snare, makhmali, tomato, tobacco, petunia, and zinna.

Some common symptoms seen in SPMMV hosts include mild leaf mottling, which is characterized by irregular patterns of marks, patches, spots, and streaks of different colors on host leaves. Also, stunting and dwarfing of the plant is common. Some hosts even have venial chlorosis. Overall, plant growth is very poor in hosts with SPMMV.

Environment
Sweet Potato Mild Mottle Virus is transmitted by Bemisia tabaci, which is the sweet potato whitefly. They are very small insects that suck in order to consume food. They are of the family Aleyrodidae of the order Homoptera. The whitefly feeds on the sweet potato commonly. In order to feed on a host plant, whiteflies pierce the phloem of the plant with its mouth, and subsequently remove nutrients.

The more time that the insect feeds on the crop, the higher chance they have of acquiring the plant virus. This will make it easier for them to transmit the virus to another plant, as they are persistent, circulative vectors. Whiteflies are mainly found in tropical areas, and have high populations in the warmer climates of the United States, Africa, and Australia.

Impact
Although there is no concrete data yet on total yield loss of crops due to SPMMV, its effect is still very real to farmers. Particularly, Sub-Saharan Africa has been affected by SPMMV. This region produces more than 7 million tons of sweet potato annually, which is about 5% of global production. According to the International Food Policy Research Institute, the sweet potato production is expected to double by 2020. Even though there has yet to be a large-scale outbreak of SPMMV in Africa, the disease still has the potential to destroy local farms that have dedicated their entire harvest to sweet potatoes.

Moreover, sweet potato is considered a food security crop for the area. It gives pretty reliable yields and is easily propagated on degraded soils. It is a great disaster recovery crop. It is also advantageous for poor households who depend on cultivating sweet potato crops for sale. In general, sweet potato is a very important crop in this region of Africa, beyond the economic payoffs. Not only is it important for selling to buyers worldwide, it also is a reliable crop that for food daily. Rural Sub-Saharan African women grow sweet potatoes near their homes simply to feed their families.

New crops of sweet potatoes can be available for harvest as quickly as 3–4 months, making this an easy crop to sell for people of all economic backgrounds. With all of this in mind, SPMMV does not have to reach catastrophic, epidemic levels for poor, malnourished, local communities to feel its effect. If the disease were to effect a small families plot of sweet potatoes used to just feed themselves, the family may not be able to have a stable food supply until they are able to grow more. The spread of SPMMV ravishes crops that people all over heavily rely on to thrive in their communities.

References

External links and references
ICTVdB - The Universal Virus Database: Sweet potato mild mottle virus
Family Groups - The Baltimore Method

Viral plant pathogens and diseases
Ipomoviruses
Sweet potatoes